Halsa is a village in the municipality of Meløy in Nordland county, Norway.  The village is located along Norwegian County Road 17, across the fjord from the village of Ågskardet.  Halsa Church is located in this village, serving the southern part of Meløy Municipality.

References

Meløy
Villages in Nordland
Populated places of Arctic Norway